is a passenger railway station located in the city of Mitoyo, Kagawa Prefecture, Japan. It is operated by JR Shikoku and has the station number "Y16".

Lines
Takase Station is served by the JR Shikoku Yosan Line and is located 47.0 km from the beginning of the line at Takamatsu. Dosan line local, Rapid Sunport, and Nanpū Relay services stop at the station. In addition, there are two trains a day running a local service on the Seto-Ōhashi Line which stop at the station.

The following JR Shikoku limited express services also stop at the station:

Layout
The station consists of an island platform serving two tracks. A station building houses a waiting room and a JR ticket window (but without a Midori no Madoguchi facility). Access to the island platform is by means of a footbridge. Parking is available outside the station. Two sidings branch off the tracks on either side of the island platform.

Adjacent stations

History
At that time the station was named  and was operated by Japanese Government Railways, later becoming Japanese National Railways (JNR). The station was renamed Takase Station on 1 October 1959. With the privatization of JNR on 1 April 1987, control of the station passed to JR Shikoku.

Surrounding area
Japan National Route 11
Mitoyo City Hall
Kagawa Prefectural Takase High School
Shikoku Gakuin University Kagawa Nishi High School

See also
 List of railway stations in Japan

References

External links

Station timetable

Railway stations in Kagawa Prefecture
Railway stations in Japan opened in 1913